Gertrude  is the largest known crater on Uranus's moon Titania. It is about 326 km across, 1/5 of Titania's diameter. It is named after the mother of Hamlet in William Shakespeare's play Hamlet.  Features on Titania are named after female Shakespearean characters.

The crater rim of Gertrude is elevated by 2 km over the crater floor. In the center of the crater there is a large dome, which resulted from the uplift of the surface immediately after the impact. The dome has the diameter of about 150 km and is 2–3 km high. The rim and dome are low for crater with such a large diameter indicating that the relief has relaxed since the impact. The surface of the dome has only few superimposed smaller craters, which means that it was modified later.

Notes

References

External links 
 Gertrude peeks over the terminator at the Planetary Society

Impact craters on Uranus' moons